The Boston University Henry M. Goldman School of Dental Medicine is the dental school of Boston University. Its curriculum is based on the Applied Professional Experience (APEX) Program, which gives students practical experience at a dental practice as part of clinical training. The School has about 800 students in predoctoral and postdoctoral programs.

The School can trace its origins to 1958 when the Boston University Medical School started a Department of Stomatology to provide postdoctoral education in dentistry.  At that time, the institution was the only one in the country devoted solely to specialty education in dentistry.  In 1963, it became Boston University School of Graduate Dentistry under the leadership of Dean Henry M. Goldman. In 1970, the School moved to 100 East Newton Street.  In 1972, the School included a predoctoral program leading to a DMD degree. In September 2021, the School completed a three-year expansion/renovation project at an approximate $115 million cost.

In 1996, the School was renamed the “Boston University Henry M. Goldman School of Dental Medicine”

In 2008, Dr. Jeffrey W. Hutter was named Dean. He retired on March 31, 2021.

In November 2021, Dr. Cataldo Leone was named Dean.

Departments

Dental School 

General Dentistry 
Digital Dentistry training
Dental students get experience with dental training robots that allow them to simulate techniques and procedures they will eventually perform on patients when they graduate and practice dentistry. 
Endodontics 
Health Policy & Health Services Research 
Molecular & Cell Biology 
Oral & Maxillofacial Pathology
Oral & Maxillofacial Surgery 
Orthodontics & Dentofacial Orthopedics 
Pediatric Dentistry 
Periodontology & Oral Biology 
Restorative Sciences/Biomaterials

Pre-Doctoral 

BA/DMD
DMD
Advanced Standing DMD (for international students who have a dental degree from a country other than the United States or Canada)

Post-Doctoral 

Advanced Education in General Dentistry
Dental Public Health
Endodontics
Implantology
Operative Dentistry
Oral & Maxillofacial Pathology
Oral & Maxillofacial Surgery
Oral Biology
Orthodontics & Dentofacial Orthopedics
Pediatric Dentistry
Periodontology
Prosthodontics

See also

American Student Dental Association

References

Boston University
Boston University Medical Campus
Educational institutions established in 1958
Dental schools in Massachusetts
1958 establishments in Massachusetts